Viola is a comune (municipality) in the Province of Cuneo in the Italian region Piedmont, located about  south of Turin and about  southeast of Cuneo.

Viola borders the following municipalities: Bagnasco, Garessio, Lisio, Monasterolo Casotto, Pamparato, and Priola.

Demographic evolution

References

Cities and towns in Piedmont
Comunità Montana Valli Mongia, Cevetta e Langa Cebana